The Slender Thread is a 1965 American drama film starring Anne Bancroft and Sidney Poitier. It was the first feature-length film directed by future Oscar-winning director, producer and actor Sydney Pollack.

Poitier portrays Alan, a college student who is volunteering at Seattle's then-new Crisis Clinic, a suicide prevention hotline. Shortly after beginning his solo duty on the night shift, Alan receives a call from a woman named Inga (Bancroft) who says she has just taken a lethal dose of pills and wants to talk to someone before she dies. The story line follows the efforts of Alan, a psychiatrist (Telly Savalas) and a detective (Ed Asner) to locate Inga and her husband Mark (Steven Hill), who is on a local fishing vessel. Various flashback scenes depict the events that led Inga to make the attempt on her life.

The film was inspired by a Life magazine article by Shana Alexander about actual events. The film is set in Seattle, and includes scenes shot on location, as well as an opening tracking aerial shot of Seattle circa 1965.

This movie is noted for the physical tracing of the call to find Inga (Bancroft) before she dies. Throughout the movie, the call is traced by hand through several electro-mechanical telephone central office switches which leads to the hotel where Inga was staying (at the Hyatt House, since demolished) near the Seattle–Tacoma International Airport.

Plot
Early one evening, psychology student Alan Newell (Sidney Poitier) rushes from the university to his shift as a volunteer telephone attendant at Seattle's then-new Crisis Clinic. As he drives past the Ballard Bridge, he doesn’t notice the car being driven erratically in the opposite lane by a woman (Anne Bancroft) with whose path his will cross later on.

As Alan arrives at the clinic, Dr. Joe Coburn (Telly Savalas), who is on his way out, gives him his telephone number for use only in case of an emergency. Marian the secretary (Indus Arthur) prepares coffee before leaving as well. Now alone, Alan is prepared for an uneventful evening as he prepares to study while manning the phones. The only call he receives is some ramblings from a drunken barber.

Then Alan receives a call from a woman who claims she has ingested a large amount of barbiturates, intending to kill herself, and wants to talk with someone before she dies. Realizing that she is serious, Alan, with the pretense of getting coffee, puts down the phone. On another line, he calls the phone company to trace the call and have the police bring Dr. Coburn back to the clinic. Alan then returns to his call with the woman.

Eventually, Dr. Coburn returns and the call is put on speaker. Marian returns as well to help, and they are joined by a medical technician who monitors the woman’s progress as he listens in. At the same time, off-duty Detective Ridley (Edward Asner) joins the police as they search for the woman, whose name Alan learns is Inga (the same woman seen driving recklessly at the beginning of the film). Through flashbacks, Inga begins to recall the events that led up to her desperate situation.

Sometime earlier, Inga’s husband Mark (Steven Hill), a commercial fisherman, inadvertently finds out that he is not the biological father of their twelve-year-old son Chris (Greg Jarvis) – something which Inga never had the nerve to tell Mark. Mark takes it hard. A fun night out and a suicide attempt by Inga later on does little for him to forgive her.

As Alan continues to talk to Inga while being supervised by Dr. Coburn, the phone company traces the call using the technology of the day. Meanwhile, Ridley finds Inga’s abandoned car, as the police continue their desperate search for her.

The call is finally traced to a hotel near the airport, where Ridley and the police search frantically for Inga. Back at the clinic, Alan and the team are relieved to hear the police entering the room and finding Inga still alive. At that moment, Mark, who was away on an expedition, enters the clinic with the police. He thanks Alan for his help before being taken by the police to be with Inga at the hospital.

Dr. Coburn also leaves for the hospital along with the medical technician, leaving Alan and Marian at the clinic. Relieved and emotionally spent, Alan lets out a triumphant cheer before continuing with the rest of his shift.

Cast

Awards
The film was nominated for two Academy Awards:
 Best Art Direction-Set Decoration, Black-and-White (Hal Pereira, Jack Poplin, Robert R. Benton, and Joseph Kish)
 Best Costume Design, Black-and White (Edith Head)

Reception
At the time, the film received indifferent reviews and did poor business at the box office upon release. However, more recent reviews give it a favorable score of 83%.

Musical score and soundtrack

The film score was composed, arranged and conducted by Quincy Jones, and the soundtrack album was released on the Mercury label in 1966.

Reception
The Vinyl Factory said "at only 26 minutes this soundtrack may be short on time but not quality. All smooth jazz grooves and rollicking vibes and gorgeous orchestrations, it’s a nice summation of the talents Jones acquired as a jazz music student in Paris in the late 1950s".

Track listing
All compositions by Quincy Jones
 "Preludium (Main Title Part II)" − 2:27
 "Main Theme (Main Title Part I)" − 2:02
 "Threadbare (Main Title Part III)" − 2:14
 "Aftermath" − 2:43
 "Fox's Sugar" − 3:27
 "Funny Farm" − 1:31
 "Theme for Inga" − 2:30
 "Psychosis" − 3:06
 "No Place to Go" − 3:08
 "Big Sir" − 2:15

Personnel 
Unidentified orchestra arranged and conducted by Quincy Jones including 
 Plas Johnson - tenor sax
 David Grusin - piano
 Howard Roberts - guitar
 Carol Kaye - electric bass
 Emil Richards - percussion

See also
List of American films of 1965

References

External links
 The Slender Thread at The Internet Movie Database
 
 1965 New York Times Review by A.H. WEILER

1965 films
1965 directorial debut films
1965 drama films
American black-and-white films
American drama films
Films about suicide
Films directed by Sydney Pollack
Films scored by Quincy Jones
Films set in Seattle
Films shot in Seattle
Films with screenplays by Stirling Silliphant
Paramount Pictures films
Films about telephony
1960s English-language films
1960s American films